"Kong Foo Sing" is a song by Australian rock band Regurgitator. The song was released in April 1996 as the second single and first single from the band's debut studio album Tu-Plang. The single peaked at number 33 in Australia. The song ranked at number 15 on Triple J's Hottest 100 in 1996.

Ben Ely said "the song was about how Quan Yeomans had sent Janet [English] from Spiderbait a box of the Kong Foo Sing fortune cookies in an effort to get her to go out with him."

Reception
In 2019, Tyler Jenke from The Brag ranked Regurgitator's best songs, with "Kong Foo Sing" coming it at number 2. Jenke said "An ode to the fortune cookie, 'Kong Foo Sing' managed to see Regurgitator become something of a household name in the world of alt-rock. Pairing catchy lyrics, samples from kung-fu films, and a crushing rhythm section, there was no doubting that this one would go on to become one of their most successful moments."

Track listings

Charts

Release history

References

 

1996 singles
1995 songs
Regurgitator songs
Songs written by Quan Yeomans
Song recordings produced by Magoo (Australian producer)
Warner Music Australasia singles